The 2017–18 EHF Champions League was the 58th edition of Europe's premier club handball tournament and the 25th edition under the current EHF Champions League format.

Montpellier defeated HBC Nantes in the final to win their second title.

Competition format
Group Stage
Twenty-eight teams participated in the competition, divided in four groups. Groups A and B were played with eight teams each, in a round robin, home and away format. The top team in each group qualified directly for the quarter-finals, the bottom two in each group dropped out of the competition and the remaining 10 teams qualified for the first knock-out phase.

In groups C and D, six teams played in each group in a round robin format, playing both home and away. The top two teams in each group then met in a ‘semi-final’ play-off, with the two winners going through to the first knock-out phase. The remaining teams dropped out of the competition.

Knock-out Phase 1 (Last 16)
12 teams played home and away in the first knock-out phase, with the 10 teams qualified from groups A and B and the two teams qualified from groups C and D.

Knock-out Phase 2 (Quarterfinals)
The six winners of the matches in the first knock-out phase joined the winners of groups A and B to play home and away for the right to play in the VELUX EHF FINAL4.

Final four
The culmination of the season, the VELUX EHF FINAL4, will continue in its existing format, with the four top teams from the competition competing for the title.

Team allocation
28 teams were directly qualified for the group stage.

Round and draw dates
The qualification draw was held in Vienna, Austria and the group stage draw in Ljubljana, Slovenia.

Qualification stage
The four teams played a semifinal and final to determine the last participant. Matches were played on 2 and 3 September 2017.

Tatran Prešov hosted the tournament.

Bracket

Semifinals

Third place game

Final

Group stage

The draw for the group stage was held on 30 June 2017 at 21:00 in the Ljubljana castle. The 28 teams were drawn into four groups, two containing eight teams (Groups A and B) and two containing six teams (Groups C and D). The only restriction is that teams from the same national association could not face each other in the same group. Since Germany qualified three teams, the lowest seeded side (Kiel) were drawn with one of the other two.

In each group, teams played against each other in a double round-robin format, with home and away matches.

After completion of the group stage matches, the teams advancing to the knockout stage were determined in the following manner:

Groups A and B – the top team qualified directly for the quarterfinals, and the five teams ranked 2nd–6th advanced to the first knockout round.
Groups C and D – the top two teams from both groups contest a playoff to determine the last two sides joining the 10 teams from Groups A and B in the first knockout round.

Group A

Group B

Group C

Group D

Playoffs

Knockout stage

The first-placed team from the preliminary groups A and B advanced to the quarterfinals, while the 2–6th placed teams advanced to the round of 16 alongside the playoff winners.

Round of 16

Quarterfinals

Final four

Final

Statistics and awards

Top goalscorers

Awards
The all-star team was announced on 25 May 2018.

Goalkeeper: 
Right wing: 
Right back: 
Centre back: 
Left back: 
Left wing: 
Pivot: 

Other awards
MVP of the Final four: 
Best Defender: 
Best Young player: 
Coach:

References

External links
Official website

 
2017
2017 in handball
2018 in handball
2017 in European sport
2018 in European sport